The Narmada Kothi is a palace in the Indian municipality of Barwaha.

History 
It was constructed by the Maharaja Holkar of Indore State (of the Marathas), as a retreat and used by him and his family to enjoy their holidays and picnics in pre-independent British India. The palace was built in European style. The Hindi/Punjabi language word "Kothi" means a luxurious home or mansion built by the wealthy higher or royal class. 

After independence of India from Britain, this mansion was taken over by the state government of Madhya Pradesh. The main floor was converted into the offices of Narmada River Valley Development Project which planned to use the waters of the River Narmada for irrigation and hydroelectric power generation through construction of dams and canals. The top floor was divided equally into the residential quarters of the superintendent engineer and chief engineer of the project. In its heyday, the palace had beautiful gardens around it with a fountain and had office staff, servants, gardeners and drivers working in its compound. Today it continues to house the state government offices of the Narmada (River) Valley Development Authority, Circle Number 8.

The Narmada Kothi was originally painted yellow with white highlights and now it is painted in a light maroon colour with white highlights but its interior still remains predominantly yellow with white highlights.

Location
It is constructed on a fortified embankment just above the high flood level mark on the banks of the Narmada River in Barwaha, in the modern day state of Madhya Pradesh. It is situated just east of the Khandwa - Indore Road Bridge over the Narmada River on the National Highway 27.

See also
 Rajwada, main palace of Indore 
 Lalbagh Palace
 Manik Bagh
 Yeshwant Club, Indore
 New Palace, Kolhapur of the Bhonsle Chhatrapatis
 Laxmi Vilas Palace, Vadodara of the Gaekwads
 Jai Vilas Palace, Gwalior of the Scindias
 Shaniwar Wada, Pune of the Peshwas
 Thanjavur Maratha palace of the Bhonsles
 Narmada Valley Development Authority, State Government of Madhya Pradesh, India.

References
 Narmada Valley Development Authority, State Government of Madhya Pradesh, India.

External links
 Madhya Pradesh Cultural Heritage Project

Buildings and structures of the Maratha Empire
Buildings and structures in Indore
Tourist attractions in Khargone district
History of Indore
History of Malwa
Establishments in the British Empire
Palaces in Madhya Pradesh
Royal residences in India
Khargone
 
Narmada River
Organisations based in Indore
Government of Madhya Pradesh
State Protected Monuments